Juan R. Candelaria (born October 27, 1970) is an American Democratic politician. He is a member of the Connecticut House of Representatives from the 95th District, being first elected in 2002.  He is a member of the Appropriations, Education, Higher Education and Employment Advancement Committees and the Joint Committee on Legislative Management Committee. Candelaria is a graduate of Albertus Magnus College and holds an MBA from the University of New Haven.

References

1970 births
Albertus Magnus College alumni
Living people
Democratic Party members of the Connecticut House of Representatives
People from Hatillo, Puerto Rico
University of New Haven alumni
21st-century American politicians